Prepoplanops is an extinct genus of ground sloth of the family Megatheriidae. It lived in the  Miocene around 18 to 16 million years ago of what is now Argentina. The only known species is Prepoplanops boleadorensis.

Description
Prepoplanops was a medium-sized ground sloth, about 1.5 to 2 meters long.

Classification
Prepoplanops was a representative of the Planopsinae, a subfamily of megatheriids that lived during the Miocene. In particular, it appears that Prepoplanops was an intermediate form between Planops and Prepotherium.

Prepoplanops boleadorensis was first described in 2013, based on fossil remains found in Argentina's Santa Cruz Province in the Cerro Boleadoras Formation.

Below is a phylogenetic tree of the Megatheriidae, based on the work of Varela and colleagues (2019).

References 

Prehistoric sloths
Miocene xenarthrans
Miocene mammals of South America
Fossil taxa described in 2013
Neogene Argentina
Fossils of Argentina
Santacrucian
Prehistoric placental genera